Professor Patrick O'Meara (born 8 September 1947) was the Master of Van Mildert College and Professor of Russian and Russian History at Durham University. Until 2003, he was Associate Professor of Russian at Trinity College, Dublin. He has held visiting fellowships at the Kennan Institute, Washington DC and Fitzwilliam College, Cambridge.

In September 2011 he retired to Oxfordshire.

Selected works
The Decembrist Pavel Pestel: Russia's First Republican,  
K.F. Ryleev: A Political Biography of the Decembrist Poet, 
The Russian Nobility in the Age of Alexander I, ISBN HB 978-1-7883-1486-2, PB 978-1-3501-9656-8

References

Living people
Academics of Durham University
Fellows of Fitzwilliam College, Cambridge
1947 births
Principals of Van Mildert College, Durham